Pierre Waidmann (Remiremont, August 19, 1860 – Neuilly-sur-Seine, October 26, 1937) was a French painter and sculptor. He was a landscape painter and also a photographer.

Biography 
Pierre Waidmann, born into a wealthy family and sensitive to the arts, moved from his native Lorraine to Paris in the late 1870s to study with Ferdinand Humbert and François-Louis Français. Ten years later he was also a pupil of Alfred Roller and Henri Gervex. In 1890 he took up residence in Paris, at 66 , but he still returned regularly to stay at the home of his grandfather, the collector  (1802–1881) where he painted numerous landscapes of the Vosges region.

In the historic 18th-century mansion where he was born, Waidmann created the interior decorations (especially marquetry and overdoors) in many rooms. In about 1884, he even set up his atelier there. He died in 1937 in Neuilly-sur-Seine, at the age of 77.

In 2011, the two museums of Remiremont, the Charles de Bruyères Museum and the Charles-Friry Museum, dedicated a retrospective to him, grouping together a hundred of his works, including sixty paintings, ceramics, terracottas and bindings.

In February and March 1896 he had a show at Le Barc de Boutteville, an avant-garde gallery in Paris

Gallery

Other works 

 Dans le jardin, 1886
 Au bord de la Moselle, environs de Remiremont, 1887
 Un pré dans les Vosges
 La Moselle, 1888
 Première neige dans les Vosges
 La Vallée de Saint-Amé, 1889
 Ruisseau dans les Vosges, 1890
 Soleil de Mars
 Eau courante dans les Vosges
 Mortagne dans les Vosges
 La Moselle, 1894
 Le Trou de Roisgneux, 1896

References

Bibliography

 Pierre Waidmann… : l'exposition de ses tableaux (Pierre Waidmann: A Showing of his Paintings), "Galerie des artistes modernes” (Gallery of Modern Artists), Paris, 1905.
 Exposition Pierre Waidmann, "Galerie Georges Petit", 1907.
 Léopold Honoré, Nos artistes: Pierre Waidmann (Our Artists: Pierre Weismann), in "La revue lorraine illustrée", Number 3, July–September 1910, pp.93–96.
 Pierre Heili, Pierre Waidmann, in "Les Vosgiens célèbres. Dictionnaire biographique illustré" (Famous People of the Vosges: Illustrated Biographical Dictionary), Albert Ronsin ed. Vagney, published by Editions Gérard Louis, 1990, pp. 367–368 – ISBN 2-907016-09-1.
 Roland Conilleau, Jean-Pierre Stocchetti, Pierre Waidmann, une vie d'artiste (Pierre Waidmann, An Artist's Life), Haroué, Ediz. Gérard Louis, 2011, 96pp. – ISBN 978-2-357-63028-4.
 Pierre Waidmann (1860–1937), un peintre en résidence (Pierre Waidmann (1860–1937), An Artist in Residence, municipal museums, 2011, 36 pp. (Catalog of the retrospective).

See also 

  Wikimedia Commons has images and other materials at Pierre Waidmann

1937 deaths
1860 births
French sculptors
20th-century French painters
19th-century French painters